A partial lunar eclipse took place on Wednesday, May 25, 1994, the first of two lunar eclipses in 1994, the second being with a penumbral lunar eclipse on Friday, November 18.

Visibility

Related eclipses

Eclipses of 1994 
 An annular solar eclipse on May 10.
 A partial lunar eclipse on May 25.
 A total solar eclipse on November 3.
 A penumbral lunar eclipse on November 18.

Lunar year series

Half-Saros cycle
A lunar eclipse will be preceded and followed by solar eclipses by 9 years and 5.5 days (a half saros). This lunar eclipse is related to two solar eclipses of Solar Saros 147.

See also 
List of lunar eclipses
List of 20th-century lunar eclipses

References

External links 
 Saros cycle 140
 

1994-05
1994 in science
May 1994 events